Poveri milionari (internationally released as Poor Millionaires) is a 1959 Italian comedy film directed by Dino Risi. It is the final chapter in the trilogy started with Poveri ma belli.

Cast 
 Maurizio Arena: Romolo 
 Renato Salvatori: Salvatore 
 Alessandra Panaro: Anna Maria 
 Lorella De Luca: Marisa 
 Sylva Koscina: Alice 
 Memmo Carotenuto: Alvaro 
 Gildo Bocci: Sor Nerone 
 Roberto Rey: Psichiatra 
 Lina Ferri: Sora Cecilia 
 Fred Buscaglione: himself

References

External links
 

1959 films
Films directed by Dino Risi
Films scored by Armando Trovajoli
Films set in Rome
Films shot in Rome
Italian comedy films
1959 comedy films
1950s Italian films